William Badders (September 15, 1901 – November 23, 1986) was a diver in the United States Navy and a recipient of the highest American military decoration, the Medal of Honor, as well as the Navy Cross.

Early life and career
William Badders was born in Harrisburg, Illinois, on September 15, 1901. He enrolled in the U.S. Naval Reserve in August 1918 and transferred to the regular Navy in December 1919.

He was Senior Member of the rescue chamber crew and served as a diver during the salvage effort. He transferred to the Fleet Reserve in March 1940.

William Badders died on November 23, 1986, and was buried in the San Francisco National Cemetery in San Francisco, California.

Awards

Medal of Honor citation
William Badders' official Navy Medal of Honor citation is as follows:

The President of the United States in the name of The Congress takes pleasure in presenting the MEDAL OF HONOR to
WILLIAM BADDERS
NAVY
for service as set forth in the following:
CITATION:

For extraordinary heroism in the line of his profession as a Diver with the Submarine and Rescue Salvage Unit, U.S.S. Falcon, during the rescue and salvage operations following the sinking of the U.S.S. Squalus on 1939-05-13. During the rescue operations, Chief Machinist's Mate Badders, as senior member of the rescue chamber crew, made the last extremely hazardous trip of the rescue chamber to attempt to rescue any possible survivors in the flooded after portion of the Squalus. He was fully aware of the great danger involved in that if he and his assistant became incapacitated, there was no way in which either could be rescued. During the salvage operations, Chief Machinist's Mate Badders made important and difficult dives under the most hazardous conditions. His outstanding performance of duty contributed much to the success of the operations and characterizes conduct far above and beyond the ordinary call of duty.

Navy Cross Citation
The President of the United States of America takes pleasure in presenting the Navy Cross to Engineman First Class William Badders, United States Navy, for extraordinary heroism and devotion to duty as a Diver, on the occasion of the salvaging of the U.S.S. S-51, from 16 October 1925 to 8 July 1926. Engineman First Class Badders actions during this operation were in keeping with the highest traditions of the United States Naval Service.

Navy and Marine Corps Medal Citation
The President of the United States of America takes pleasure in presenting the Navy and Marine Corps Medal to Chief Machinist's Mate William Badders, United States Navy in lieu of previously awarded letters of commendation: (A) Commendation by Secretary of the Navy dated August 6, 1926 (B) Commendation by Secretary of the Navy dated May 12, 1928 (C) Commendation by Commander in Chief Army & Navy dated September 16, 1939 (D) Commendation by ChBuNav dated December 27, 1940. 

Badders also received the Good Conduct Medal, World War I Victory Medal, Yangtze Service Medal and American Defense Service Medal.

See also

List of Medal of Honor recipients
List of Medal of Honor recipients in non-combat incidents

References

1901 births
1986 deaths
United States Navy personnel of World War I
Machinists
United States Navy Medal of Honor recipients
Recipients of the Navy Cross (United States)
People from Harrisburg, Illinois
United States Navy sailors
Non-combat recipients of the Medal of Honor
Burials at San Francisco National Cemetery